Same-sex marriage in Minnesota has been fully recognized since August 1, 2013. Same-sex marriages have been recognized if performed in other jurisdictions since July 1, 2013, and the state began issuing marriage licenses to same-sex couples on August 1, 2013. After 51.9% of state voters rejected a constitutional amendment to ban same-sex marriage in November 2012, the Minnesota Legislature passed a same-sex marriage bill in May 2013, which Governor Mark Dayton signed on May 14, 2013. Minnesota was the second state in the Midwest, after Iowa, to legalize marriage between same-sex couples, and the first in the region to do so by enacting legislation rather than by court order. Minnesota was the first state to reject a constitutional amendment banning same-sex marriage, though Arizona rejected one in 2006 that banned all legal recognition and later approved one banning only marriage.

Minnesota is also where one of the first same-sex marriage cases in the world took place. In Baker v. Nelson, the Minnesota Supreme Court held unanimously in 1972 that it did not violate the U.S. Constitution to limit marriage to opposite-sex couples, and the U.S. Supreme Court refused to hear the case on appeal. This decision would finally be repealed on June 26, 2015 in the case of Obergefell v. Hodges.

Legal history

Lawsuits
Baker v. Nelson was the first case in the history of the United States in which a same-sex couple sued for marriage rights. In late 1971, the Minnesota Supreme Court affirmed a lower court decision to prohibit marriages between same-sex partners, noting that its interpretation of state law did not violate the Constitution of the United States. The U.S. Supreme Court accepted their appeal but declined to review the case. On October 10, 1972, a one-sentence order said, "The appeal is dismissed for want of a substantial federal question." In early 1971, the couple in question, Michael McConnell and Jack Baker, re-applied in Blue Earth County and obtained a marriage license. Baker's name change to Pat Lyn may have encouraged county officials to assume they were a heterosexual couple. Reverend Roger Lynn, a minister from the Hennepin Avenue United Methodist Church, conducted the ceremony at a private home. Because the license was never revoked, their wedding became the earliest same-sex marriage ever to be recorded in the public files of any civil government.  

Responding to the state Supreme Court ruling, at the Minnesota Democratic–Farmer–Labor Party (DFL) State Convention in June 1972, delegates voted to add a plank to the party platform supporting same-sex marriage rights. This is the first known case of support by a major United States political party for same-sex marriage, though it is worth noting that many DFL state representatives disassociated themselves from the plank and the DFL party rules subsequently changed to make amendments to the party platform much harder to achieve for future conventions.

In May 2010, Marry Me Minnesota, a gay rights organization, sued the state of Minnesota, challenging the state's Defense of Marriage Act, which was passed in 1997. The trial court dismissed the suit in March 2011, citing Baker v. Nelson as "binding precedent". Marry Me Minnesota, founded by same-sex couples for the purpose of suing the state, announced plans to appeal the decision.

Efforts to amend the State Constitution

In 2004, 2006, 2007 and 2009, bills were introduced to the Minnesota House of Representatives and Senate to have voters consider an amendment to the Minnesota Constitution, restricting marriage to unions between a man and a woman and outlawing civil unions that offer comparable rights.

On May 11, 2011, the Minnesota Senate passed a bill by 37 votes to 27 to place a proposed amendment to the State Constitution on the ballot that would ban same-sex marriage, though not civil unions. It passed the House ten days later 70–62. The question presented to voters on the ballot on November 8, 2012 read: "Shall the Minnesota Constitution be amended to provide that only a union of one man and one woman shall be valid or recognized as a marriage in Minnesota?" The amendment was defeated by Minnesota voters, making Minnesota the first U.S. state to reject a constitutional ban on same-sex marriage. Arizona rejected a ban on same-sex marriages and civil unions in 2006 but then adopted a ban on only same-sex marriages in 2008. Minnesota's constitutional amendment proposal was rejected by 51.9% of voters.

The amendment was opposed by the grassroot organization Minnesotans United for All Families. President Barack Obama also expressed his opposition to the amendment, as did Minnesota Vikings football player Chris Kluwe who featured in numerous advertisements opposing the amendment. The main organization to support the amendment was Minnesota for Marriage, which was supported by the state's Roman Catholic bishops.

Same-sex marriage law

In 1997, the Minnesota Legislature passed a statutory ban on same-sex marriage shortly after passage of the federal Defense of Marriage Act in the United States Congress.

In late 2008, Senator John Marty, announced plans to introduce a bill legalizing same-sex marriage. On February 19, 2009, a bill to allow civil unions was introduced to the Minnesota House of Representatives, and sponsored by representatives Joe Mullery, Mindy Greiling, and Tom Tillberry. A same-sex marriage bill was introduced to the Minnesota Senate on March 5, 2009. Its authors were senators Scott Dibble, Linda Higgins, John Marty, Mee Moua, and Patricia Torres Ray. The bill failed to get a hearing by the Senate Judiciary Committee.

In December 2012, Representative Alice Hausman and Senator Marty announced plans to introduce same-sex marriage legislation in 2013. They and legislative leaders expressed varying views on its prospects. In January 2013, Senator Dibble said Democrats planned to focus early in the session on "kitchen-table issues" of improving the economy and creating jobs and would wait at least a month or two before pressing for the legalization of same-sex marriage. On February 28, 2013, HF 1054, officially titled Marriage between two persons provided for, and exemptions and protections based in religious associations provided for, was introduced in the Minnesota Legislature to legalize same-sex marriage in the state. On March 12, both the Senate and House policy committees passed the same version of the marriage bill, Senate Bill SF925 and House Bill HF1054. Other committees of each chamber reviewed the financial impact of the legislation on 6 and 7 May. On May 9, 2013, the House passed the legislation by a vote of 75–59, with all but two Democrats voting for the bill and all but four Republicans voting against. On May 13, 2013, the Senate passed the bill on a vote of 37–30, with all but three Democrats voting for the bill and all but one Republican voting against. Governor Mark Dayton signed the bill into law on May 14, 2013 on the south steps of the Minnesota State Capitol before a crowd of 6,000 people. Under the provisions of the legislation, the first same-sex marriage were likely to take place on August 1, 2013. The legislation also gives Minnesota courts authority over divorce proceedings in the case of a same-sex couple married in Minnesota when neither party resides in a state that recognizes their marriage. Some Minnesota counties announced plans to make marriage licenses available as early as June 6.

The law took effect on July 1, 2013, and Minnesota has recognized the validity of same-sex marriage from other jurisdictions since then. The state began issuing its own marriage certificates to same-sex couples on August 1, 2013. Margaret Miles and Cathy ten Broeke were the first couple to be married in Minneapolis at midnight on August 1, 2013, in a ceremony at Minneapolis City Hall officiated by Mayor R.T. Rybak. The definition of marriage in the state of Minnesota is now the following:

Native American nations
Same-sex marriage is legal on the reservations of the Fond du Lac Band of Lake Superior Chippewa, the Grand Portage Band of Chippewa, and the Leech Lake Band of Ojibwe, three Ojibwe tribes forming part of the Minnesota Chippewa Tribe, as well as the Prairie Island Indian Community, a Dakota tribe. The Ojibwe people have traditionally recognized two-spirit people who were born male but wore women's clothing and performed everyday household work and artistic handiwork which were regarded as belonging to the feminine sphere. Many agokwe were wives in polygnyous households. Many  married cisgender men, without indicating of polygyny, but some remained unmarried and lived in their own tipis, and were visited by married men for sexual intercourse when the men's wives were pregnant or menstruating, and therefore when sexual intercourse was forbidden to them. The two-spirit status thus allowed for marriages between two biological males to be performed in these tribes.

Economic impact
The Williams Institute estimated in April 2013 that if marriage were extended to same-sex couples in Minnesota, the state would see an economic boost of $42 million over the course of three years, with a boost of $27 million in the first year alone. This net impact would be the result of savings in expenditures on state means-tested public benefit programs and an increase in state income and sales tax revenue.

Marriage statistics
Approximately 1,640 same-sex couples married in Minnesota from August to September 2013, representing about one-third of all marriages performed during that time. 75% of same-sex marriage licenses were issued in Hennepin and Ramsey counties. Approximately 1,433 marriage licenses were issued in the twelve counties that rejected Minnesota Amendment 1 in 2012. Of the counties that favored the amendment, Clay County issued the most marriage licenses at 31.

The Minnesota State Demographer's office announced that there were 8,594 married same-sex households in the state in July 2016.

Domestic partnerships
Eighteen cities in Minnesota, covering a total population of more than one million, have domestic partnership registries allowing unmarried same-sex and opposite-sex couples the right to obtain a certificate signifying that they are not related by blood and are committed to each other. Minneapolis was the first city to establish a domestic partnership registry in the state in 1991, followed by Duluth (2009), St. Paul (2009), Edina (2010), Rochester (2010), Maplewood (2010), Golden Valley (2010), St. Louis Park (2011), Red Wing (2011), Richfield (2011), Shoreview (2011), Robbinsdale (2011), Falcon Heights (2011), Hopkins (2011), Shorewood (2011), Crystal (2011), Eagan (2012), and Eden Prairie (2012).

Public opinion
{| class="wikitable"
|+style="font-size:100%" | Public opinion for same-sex marriage in Minnesota
|-
! style="width:190px;"| Poll source
! style="width:200px;"| Date(s)administered
! class=small | Samplesize
! Margin oferror
! style="width:100px;"| % support
! style="width:100px;"| % opposition
! style="width:40px;"| % no opinion
|-
| Public Religion Research Institute
| align=center| March 8–November 9, 2021
| align=center| ?
| align=center| ?
|  align=center| 82%
| align=center| 17%
| align=center| 1%
|-
| Public Religion Research Institute
| align=center| January 7–December 20, 2020
| align=center| 886 random telephoneinterviewees
| align=center| ?
|  align=center| 78%
| align=center| 19%
| align=center| 3%
|-
| Public Religion Research Institute
| align=center| April 5–December 23, 2017
| align=center| 1,412 random telephoneinterviewees
| align=center| ?
|  align=center| 67%
| align=center| 27%
| align=center| 6%
|-
| Public Religion Research Institute
| align=center| May 18, 2016–January 10, 2017
| align=center| 2,060 random telephoneinterviewees
| align=center| ?
|  align=center| 63%
| align=center| 27%
| align=center| 10%
|-
| Public Religion Research Institute
| align=center| April 29, 2015–January 7, 2016
| align=center| 1,496 random telephoneinterviewees
| align=center| ?
|  align=center| 57%
| align=center| 37%
| align=center| 6%
|-
| rowspan=2 colspan=1 | Edison Research
| rowspan=2 colspan=1 align=center | November 4, 2014
| rowspan=2 colspan=1 align=center | ?
| rowspan=2 colspan=1 align=center | ?
|  align=center| 58%
| align=center| 39%
| align=center| 3%
|-
|  align=center| 58%
| align=center| 39%
| align=center| 3%
|-
| New York Times/CBS News/YouGov
| align=center| September 20–October 1, 2014
| align=center| 2,562 likely voters
| align=center| ± 2.2%
|  align=center| 52%
| align=center| 34%
| align=center| 13%
|-
| Public Religion Research Institute
| align=center| April 2, 2014–January 4, 2015
| align=center| 1,035
| align=center| ?
|  align=center| 58%
| align=center| 33%
| align=center| 8%
|-
| Star Tribune Minnesota
| align=center| June 11–13, 2013
| align=center| 800 adults
| align=center| ± 3.5%
|  align=center| 46%
| align=center| 44%
| align=center| 10%
|-
| SurveyUSA
| align=center| April 19–21, 2014
| align=center| 500 adults
| align=center| ± 4.5%
|  align=center| 51%
| align=center| 47%
| align=center| 2%
|-
| Public Policy Polling
| align=center| January 18–20, 2013
| align=center| 1,065 voters
| align=center| ± 3%
|  align=center| 47%
| align=center| 45%
| align=center| 8%
|-
| Public Policy Polling
| align=center| November 2–3, 2012
| align=center| 1,164 likely voters
| align=center| ± 2.9%
|  align=center| 49%
| align=center| 41%
| align=center| 10%
|-
| Public Policy Polling
| align=center| October 5–8, 2012
| align=center| 937 likely voters
| align=center| ± 3.2%
|  align=center| 47%
| align=center| 43%
| align=center| 10%
|-
| Public Policy Polling
| align=center| September 10–11, 2012
| align=center| 824 likely voters
| align=center| ± 3.4%
| align=center| 43%
|  align=center| 46%
| align=center| 11%
|-
| Public Policy Polling
| align=center| May 31–June 3, 2012
| align=center| 973 voters
| align=center| ± 3.1%
|  align=center| 47%
| align=center| 42%
| align=center| 11%
|-
| Public Policy Polling
| align=center| January 21–22, 2012
| align=center| 1,236 voters
| align=center| ± 2.8%
| align=center| 43%
|  align=center| 47%
| align=center| 10%
|-
| Public Policy Polling
| align=center| May 27–30, 2011
| align=center| 1,179 voters
| align=center| ± 2.9%
|  align=center| 46%
| align=center| 45%
| align=center| 9%
|-

See also
LGBT rights in Minnesota
Same-sex marriage in the United States

References

External links
HF 1054 Status in the House for the 88th Legislature (2013 - 2014), MN Revisor's Office
 McConnell, Michael. The Wedding Heard Heard 'Round the World: America's First Gay Marriage. Minneapolis, MN: University of Minnesota Press, 2016.

Minnesota
LGBT rights in Minnesota
2013 in LGBT history
2013 in Minnesota